The Leonard P. Zakim Bunker Hill Memorial Bridge (also known as “The Zakim”) is a cable-stayed bridge completed in 2003 across the Charles River in Boston, Massachusetts. It is a replacement for the Charlestown High Bridge, an older truss bridge constructed in the 1950s. 

The bridge and connecting tunnel were built as part of the Big Dig, the largest highway construction project in the United States. The bridge's unique styling quickly became an icon for Boston, often featured in the backdrop of national news channels, to establish location, and included on tourist souvenirs. The bridge is commonly referred to as the "Zakim Bridge" or "Bunker Hill Bridge" by residents of nearby Charlestown.  

The Leverett Circle Connector Bridge was constructed in conjunction with the Zakim Bridge, allowing some traffic to bypass it.

Design 

The bridge concept was designed by Swiss civil engineer Christian Menn in collaboration with bridge designer Miguel Rosales and its design was engineered by American civil engineer Ruchu Hsu with Parsons Brinckerhoff. Wallace Floyd Associates, sub-consultants to Bechtel/Parsons Brinckerhoff, was the lead architect/urban designer and facilitated community participation during the design process. 

The bridge is a cable-stayed bridge in a harp configuration with cradles carrying each strand through their pylon. The main portion of the Zakim Bridge carries four lanes each way (northbound and southbound) of Interstate 93 (concurrent with U.S. Route 1) between the Thomas P. "Tip" O'Neill Jr. Tunnel and the elevated highway to the north. Two additional lanes are cantilevered outside the cables, which carry northbound traffic from the Sumner Tunnel and North End on-ramp. These lanes merge with the main highway north of the bridge. I-93 heads toward New Hampshire as the "Northern Expressway", and US 1 splits from the Interstate and travels northeast toward Massachusetts' North Shore communities, crossing the Mystic River via the Tobin Bridge.

The 1975-built MBTA Orange Line's Haymarket North Extension tunnel lies beneath the bridge.

Dedication 
The bridge's full name commemorates Boston area leader and civil rights activist Leonard P. Zakim, who championed "building bridges between peoples", and the Battle of Bunker Hill.

The bridge was dedicated on October 4, 2002, in a ceremony held on the new span. The dedication speakers included members of Zakim's family, government officials, and a performance of the song "Thunder Road" by Bruce Springsteen.

Introducing the song, Springsteen said about Zakim, "... I knew him a little bit during the last year of his life, he was one of those people whose, intensity, inner spirit you could feel even when he was very ill, ... we honor his memory obviously not with this beautiful bridge, very lovely, but by continuing on in his fight for social justice."

Landscape design and public art 

Placement of footings for the Zakim Bridge required environmental permits to relocate areas of open water surface, changing the contour of the Charles River shoreline. The process of landscape design and environmental mitigation under the bridge deck and around the bridge supports allowed for the creation of a new and accessible public landscape designed by Carol R. Johnson Associates. This under bridge landscape contains a series of perforated stainless steel lighting-based public artworks, entitled, Five Beacons for the Lost Half Mile.

Pedestrians and cyclists are able to travel from Charlestown toward Cambridge over the adjacent North Bank Pedestrian Bridge to North Point Park. This bridge is a link in the Charles River Bike Path.

Gallery

See also 

 Josh Zakim
 List of crossings of the Charles River

References

External links 

 The Leonard P. Zakim Bunker Hill Bridge web site
 Fact sheet on the Leonard P. Zakim Bunker Hill Bridge 
 
 Description and history on bostonroads.com
 Zakim bridge as viewed from former location of Spaulding Rehab Hospital
 Leonard P. Zakim Bunker Hill Memorial Bridge | foundations
 Zakim Bridge architect pays to keep the lights on
 Bland Zakim Bridge leaves us feeling blue
 MassDOT Reveals Zakim Bridge New Lighting 
 New Lighting Revealed for Zakim Bunker Hill Bridge
 A new type of Cape escape, and a Zakim unveiling
 Lawrence model bridge builders meet their role model
 The Leonard P. Zakim Bunker Hill Bridge – Philips Color Kinetics Case Study
 Zakim Bridge Turns 15

Bridges completed in 2003
Zakim
Transportation in Cambridge, Massachusetts
Towers in Massachusetts
Cable-stayed bridges in the United States
Interstate 93
Landmarks in North End, Boston
U.S. Route 1
Buildings and structures in Cambridge, Massachusetts
Bridges in Middlesex County, Massachusetts
Road bridges in Massachusetts
Bridges on the Interstate Highway System
Bridges of the United States Numbered Highway System
Bridges over the Charles River
2003 establishments in Massachusetts
Concrete bridges in the United States
Steel bridges in the United States